The Theft Act 1968 (c 60) is an Act of the Parliament of the United Kingdom. It creates a number of offences against property in England and Wales.
On 15 January 2007 the Fraud Act 2006 came into force, redefining most of the offences of deception.

History
The Theft Act 1968 resulted from the efforts of the Criminal Law Revision Committee to reform the English law of theft. The Larceny Act 1916 had codified the common law, including larceny itself,  but it remained a complex web of offences. The intention of the Theft Act 1968, was to replace the existing law of larceny and other deception-related offences, by a single enactment, creating a more coherent body of principles that would allow the law to evolve to meet new situations.

Provisions
A number of greatly simplifiedor at least less complicatedoffences were created.

Section 1 – Basic definition of "theft"
This section creates the offence of theft. This definition is supplemented by sections 2 to 6. The definition of theft under the Theft Act 1968 is:

Section 2 – "Dishonestly"
This section provides a partial definition of dishonesty for certain purposes.

Section 3 – "Appropriation"
Appropriation is defined as "Any assumption by a person of the rights of an owner".

The courts have interpreted the assumption "of the rights of an owner" to mean that a person assumes at least one of a set of rights rather than having to assume all of the rights of the owners. This interpretation of the legislation was originally given in the case of R v Morris; Anderton v Burnside [1984] UKHL 1, and it has been endorsed by the decision in R v Gomez [1993] AC 442.

Section 4 – "Property"
The definition of property is:

Section 5 – "Belonging to another"
The definition of belonging to another is 

It is possible to have a proprietary right or interest over property that in the ordinary sense belongs to someone else. In the case of R v Turner (No. 2) [1971] 1 WLR 901, the Court of Appeal found that a man had committed theft by driving away his car without having paid for repairs made on the car. The garage that repaired his car had a proprietary right over it.

One can have a controlling interest in a piece of property even after selling it. In R v Marshall [1998] 2 Cr App R 282, a group of defendants resold used tickets for the London Underground. The Court of Appeal dismissed their appeal in part because the tickets said they were the property of London Underground, a condition of sale agreed to by the original buyer of the ticket.

Section 5 includes subsections that deal with possession that has conditions. Section 5(3) deals with situations where a person has given property to another for a particular purpose: the person receiving the property is said to be engaging in theft if they use the property for some purpose it was not intended. If A gives B money to purchase a particular good for A and B buys something else with it without A's consent, even though the property is not in A's hands, A still has a controlling interest in it under Section 5(3).

If one is placed under a duty to use property in a particular way, that obligation must be legal under civil law according to the Court of Appeal in R v Breaks and Huggan (1998).

There are limits to the legal obligations one is liable for under Section 5(3). In R v. Hall (1972), a customer paid a deposit to a travel agent. The deposit was paid into the company's bank account but the travel agent went out of business. This was not an instance of theft as the money was legitimately paid as a deposit against cancellation and there was no specific obligation to spend the money in a particular way.

Section 5(4) requires that if property is received by mistake it must be returned and failure to do so counts as appropriation. This was seen in action in Attorney-General's Reference (No. 1 of 1983) where a police officer was given £74 extra in her wages but failed to return it or alert her superiors to it. The Court of Appeal held it to be theft.

Section 6 – "Intention to permanently deprive"
This section provides that a person in order to be guilty of theft had the intention of permanently depriving the other of the property. In certain cases, the intention to deprive may be construed, even when the person may not have meant to deprive another of their property permanently, for example if the intention is to treat another's property as one's own to dispose of regardless of the other's rights.

Section 7 – Theft
This section provides that a person convicted of theft on indictment is liable to imprisonment to a term not exceeding seven years.

Section 8 – Robbery
Section 8(1) creates the offence of robbery. Section 8(2) provides that a person convicted on indictment of robbery or assault with intent to rob is liable to imprisonment for life. Common assault itself is defined at common law.

Section 9 – Burglary
This section codifies the offence of burglary and provides for penalties for that offence on conviction on indictment. The offence consists of entering a building (including an "inhabited vehicle or vessel", such as a caravan or ship, and regardless of whether any inhabitant is there at the time) as a trespasser, either with intent to commit (section 9(1)(a)), or actually committing or attempting to commit (section 9(1)(b)), an offence of theft, grievous bodily harm, or criminal damage. "Theft" for this purpose includes taking a conveyance without consent contrary to section 12(1). The maximum sentence is ten years' imprisonment, or fourteen years if the building is a dwelling.

The entry may be by entry of the full body, entry of part of the body or entry by an instrument.

Originally, rape was one of the offences that could lead to a charge of burglary. This very narrow definition was replaced with the more general offence of trespass with intent to commit a sexual offence by section 63 of the Sexual Offences Act 2003. Trespass is usually a civil matter in English law.

Section 10 – Aggravated burglary
Section 10(1) creates the offence of aggravated burglary, which involves the use of weapons or explosives. Section 10(2) provides that a person guilty of that offence is liable, on conviction on indictment, to imprisonment for life.

Section 11 – Removal of articles from places open to the public
This section creates the offence of removing article from place open to the public and provides that a person guilty of that offence is liable, on conviction on indictment, to imprisonment for a term not exceeding five years.

Section 12 – Taking motor vehicle or other conveyance without authority
Section 12(1) creates an offence of taking a conveyance without authority (referred to in police jargon as "taking without consent" or TWOC), which falls short of theft in that there is no intent to permanently deprive the owner of possession. "Conveyance" includes a land, water or air vehicle, but not an unmanned or remote-controlled vehicle, nor a pedal cycle. It is a summary offence with a maximum sentence of a level 5 fine on the standard scale or six months' imprisonment, or both.

Section 12(4) allows a jury to return a verdict of TWOC on an indictment for theft of a vehicle.

Section 12(5) creates a separate offence of taking a pedal cycle.

Section 12A – Aggravated vehicle-taking
This section, which was added by the Aggravated Vehicle-Taking Act 1992, creates an offence of aggravated vehicle taking, which involves either dangerous driving or causing injury or damage. It can only be committed in respect of a motor vehicle. It is an indictable offence carrying a maximum sentence of two years, or fourteen if it causes a person's death.

Section 13 – Abstracting of electricity
This section creates the offence of abstracting electricity. It replaces section 10 of the Larceny Act 1916. It is an indictable offence with a maximum sentence of five years.

Section 14 – Thefts from mails outside England and Wales 
This section provides that theft of or from mail bags being transported between jurisdictions in Britain (including the Isle of Man and the Channel Islands), and robbery etc. during such a theft, can be prosecuted as though it was committed in England and Wales, even if the offence was committed elsewhere. This removes the burden on the prosecution to prove, for example, exactly where a train was when a theft took place on it.

Section 15 – Obtaining property by deception
This section created the offence of obtaining property by deception, a statutory version of the common law offence of cheating, and provided a definition of deception for the purpose of that offence and the offences under sections 15A, 16 and 20(2) of this Act and sections 1 and 2 of the Theft Act 1978. It was repealed and replaced by the more general offence of fraud under the Fraud Act 2006.

Sections 15A and 15B – Obtaining a money transfer by deception
Section 15A created the offence of obtaining a money transfer by deception. Section 15B made supplementary provision. They were repealed and replaced by the more general offence of fraud under the Fraud Act 2006.

Section 16 – Obtaining pecuniary advantage by deception
This section created the offence of obtaining pecuniary advantage by deception. It was repealed and replaced by the more general offence of fraud under the Fraud Act 2006.

Section 17 – False accounting
This section creates an offence of false accounting. It is an indictable offence with a maximum sentence of seven years.

Section 18 – Liability of company officers for certain offences by company
This section makes officers of corporations liable for offences under section 17 committed by the company where the offence was committed with the "consent or connivance" of that officer. Originally this also applied to offences under sections 15 and 16, but this was replaced by the offence of participating in a fraudulent business under section 9 of the Fraud Act 2006.

Section 19 – False statements by company directors etc
This section adds liability for any officer of a corporation or legal entity who publishes false accounts with intent to deceive members or creditors of the body corporate or association about its affairs. It is an indictable offence with a maximum sentence of seven years.

Section 20 – Suppression, etc, of documents
Section 20(1) creates the offence of dishonestly destroying, defacing or concealing certain documents with intent to make a gain for oneself or loss for another. It is an indictable offence with a maximum sentence of seven years.

Section 20(2) created the offence of procuring the execution of a valuable security by deception. This was replaced by fraud under the Fraud Act 2006.

Section 21 – Blackmail
This section creates the offence of blackmail. It is an indictable offence with a maximum sentence of fourteen years.

Section 22 – Handling stolen goods
This section creates the offence of handling stolen goods. It is an indictable offence with a maximum sentence of fourteen years.

Section 23 – Advertising rewards for return of goods stolen or lost
This section replaces section 102 of the Larceny Act 1861. The offence is made out only if the advertisement uses words to the effect that no questions will be asked, or claims to indemnify the person returning the goods against prosecution or reimburse them for any money paid or loaned for the goods. The printer or publisher is liable as well as the advertiser.

A person guilty of an offence under this section is liable, on summary conviction, to a fine not exceeding level 3 on the standard scale.

Section 24 – Scope of offences relating to stolen goods
This section defines "stolen goods" for the purpose of relevant offences. In particular, goods stolen outside England and Wales (by way of a criminal offence in the relevant jurisdiction), and goods obtained by blackmail or fraud (within the meaning of the Fraud Act 2006), though not the object of an offence of theft under this Act, nonetheless qualify as stolen.

Section 24A – Dishonestly retaining a wrongful credit
This section, added by the Theft (Amendment) Act 1996, prohibits receiving a transfer of money to one's account that one knows or believes derives from theft, blackmail, fraud, or stolen goods, and dishonestly not trying to cancel the transfer. It is an indictable offence with a maximum sentence of ten years.

Section 25 – Going equipped

This section creates an offence of "going equipped" for burglary or theft. It is described by the marginal note to that section as "going equipped for stealing, etc", and by the preceding crossheading as "possession of housebreaking implements, etc". It includes any item that is designed to be used to carry out a theft or burglary, as well as any items made specifically by a thief for use in committing a burglary, etc. It is an indictable offence with a maximum sentence of three years.

The offence originally applied also to the offence under section 15 of this Act, as a statutory version of the common law offence of going equipped for cheat. This application was replaced by section 6 of the Fraud Act 2006.

See also
Theft Act

Notes

References
Allen, Michael. Textbook on Criminal Law. Oxford: Oxford University Press. (2005) .
Criminal Law Revision Committee. 8th Report. Theft and Related Offences. Cmnd. 2977
Griew, Edward. Theft Acts 1968 & 1978, Sweet & Maxwell. 
Martin, Jacqueline. Criminal Law for A2, Hodder Arnold (2006). 
Ormerod, David. Smith and Hogan Criminal Law, 11th Ed., Oxford: Oxford University Press. (2005) 
Smith, J. C. Law of Theft, LexisNexis: London. (1997)

External links

Text of the Theft Act, as amended

Acts of the Parliament of the United Kingdom concerning England and Wales
English criminal law
United Kingdom Acts of Parliament 1968